The Blind Chess Olympiad is an international chess competition for the blind in which teams from all over the world compete against each other.  The event takes place every four years, and is sponsored by the International Braille Chess Association. The Blind Chess Olympiad is the largest sporting event in the international field of chess for the visually impaired.

History
The forerunner to the Blind Chess Olympiads was a blind chess tournament held in Rheinbreitbach, Germany, in 1958.  The winner of the event was Reginald Walter Bonham, who would found the International Braille Chess Association.  The first official Blind Chess Olympiad was held in 1961 in Meschede, Germany.  Eight teams competed to play 122 games in round-robin format with Team Yugoslavia as the resulting winner.  For the third Blind Chess Olympiad in 1968, held in Weymouth, England, 20 teams competed. Russia won the event with Yugoslavia in second place. The Polish team arrived by train in the early hours of the morning bringing with them the body of their sighted translator who had died en route (Reference: Organizer, John Graham).
By the 2008 13th Blind Chess Olympiad in Heraklion, Crete, 34 teams participated, making the Blind Chess Olympiad the most significant sporting event in the international field of chess for the blind to date.

Results

See also

 Chess variants

References

External links
 Olympiads results at IBCA website

Chess Olympiads
Parasports competitions
Blind sports